Ysgol Gymraeg Dewi Sant, (St David's Primary School) Llanelli, Wales, was the first Welsh medium school to be run by a local authority. It was opened by Miss Olwen Williams on  Saint David's Day (1 March) 1947. The school was run in the Zion chapel school room. In 2017 a plaque was unveiled by the children of the school to honour that they were the first Welsh school ever to be opened. A step up for the Welsh language which was spoken by, and still is spoken by over half Llanelli's population. The plaque is on the wall of Zion chapel school room, which is opposite Theatr Y Ffwrnes in Llanelli Town centre.

References

Welsh-language schools
Llanelli